The 2019 Beach Soccer Intercontinental Cup was the ninth edition of the Beach Soccer Intercontinental Cup, an annual international beach soccer tournament contested by men's national teams. Held in Dubai, United Arab Emirates since its inception, this year's event occurs between 5 and 9 November. The tournament was organised by the Dubai Sports Council (DSC) and Beach Soccer Worldwide (BSWW). Unlike in previous editions, there was no lead sponsor this year.

The Intercontinental Cup is typically seen as the biggest tournament in the current international beach soccer calendar after the FIFA Beach Soccer World Cup. Similar in nature to that of the FIFA Confederations Cup, eight nations took part.

The tournament started with a round robin group stage. The winners and runners-up from each group advanced to the knockout stage, a series of single-elimination matches, beginning with the semi-finals and ending with the final. Consolation matches were also played to determine other final rankings.

The season-ending Beach Soccer Stars awards were also presented in Dubai as a conclusion to the tournament.

Iran were the defending champions and successfully retained their title, winning a third Intercontinental Cup crown by beating Spain 6–3 in the final. Hosts UAE matched their best previous performance of third place for the first time since 2013.

Participating teams
The following eight teams took part.

Overall, Europe and Asia were represented by three nations; Africa and North America, one nation each. Oceania, and for the first time, South America, did not enter any teams.

1. Qualified as hosts, but also achieved a 2019 AFC Beach Soccer Championship runners-up finish

Venue
The tournament took place in Dubai, United Arab Emirates; this edition was held at a purpose-built arena on Kite Beach, Jumeirah 3, for the second consecutive year with a capacity of 2,500.

Sponsors
The following were the official sponsors of the tournament:

Emirates
Audi
Al Nabooda Automobiles
Huawei
RAKBANK

TikTok
Aquafina
Pocari Sweat
Mycujoo
Prozis

Draw
The draw to split the eight teams into two groups of four took place on 9 October at the Dubai Sports Council headquarters at 11:00 GST (UTC+4) and was conducted by former Real Madrid defender, Míchel Salgado.

For the purposes of the draw, the nations were divided into two pots, shown in the table below; the teams were split based on their BSWW World Ranking – the top three teams plus the hosts were placed into Pot 1 whilst the lowest four teams of the ranking were placed in Pot 2. As each was drawn, the placement of the teams alternated back and forth between Groups A and B. The hosts, the United Arab Emirates, were automatically allocated to position A1.

The composition of the pots is shown below:

Note: The numbers in parentheses show the world ranking of the teams at the time of the draw.

Group stage
Matches are listed as local time in Dubai, GST (UTC+4)

Group A

Group B

5th–8th place play-offs
The teams finishing in third and fourth place are knocked out of title-winning contention, receding to play in consolation matches to determine 5th through 8th place in the final standings.

5th–8th place semi-finals

Seventh place play-off

Fifth place play-off

Knockout stage

The group winners and runners-up progress to the knockout stage to continue to compete for the title.

Semi finals

Third place play-off

Final

Awards

Winners trophy

Individual awards

Statistics

Goalscorers
6 goals
 Amir Akbari

5 goals

 Gabriele Gori
 Takaaki Oba

4 goals

 Eduard Suarez
 Nestor Martinez
 Boris Nikonorov

3 goals

 Jose Cintas
 Javi Torres
 Salvador "Chiky" Ardil
 Mohammadali Mokhtari 
 Mohammad Ahmadzadeh
 Mohammad Masoumizadeh
 Ramon Maldonado
 Ahmed Beshr
 Dario Ramacciotti
 Emmanuele Zurlo
 Marcello Percia Montani
 Keisuke Matsuda
 Ozu Moreira
 Abdelrahman Hassan
 Mohamed Abdelnaby
 Moustafa Shaaban
 Vladimir Raskin
 Masanori Okuyama

2 goals

 Llorenç Gomez
 David Adril
 Mostafa Kiani
 Hamid Behzadpour
 Waleed Beshr
 Ali Mohammadi
 Walid Mohammadi
 Josep Junior
 Marco Giordani
 Naoya Matsuo
 Shusei Yamauchi
 Ahmed Elshahat
 Mostafa Samir
 Jose Vizcarra
 Adrian Frutos
 Alessio Frainetti
 Viktor Kryshanov

1 goal

 Elhusseini Taha Rashed 
 Ali Mirshekari
 Saeid Piramoun
 Kamal Ali Sulaiman
 Abbas Ali
 Andrea Carpita
 Paolo Palmacci
 Takuya Akaguma
 Masayuki Komaki 
 Moustafa Aly Mohamed
 Hassane Mohamed Hassane
 Diego Villasenor
 Daniel Macias
 Maxim Chuzhkov
 Andrey Novikov
 Alexey Pavlenko
 Ostap Fedorov
 Vladislav Zharikov 

Own goals

 Keisuke Matsuda (vs. UAE)
 Hassane Mohamed Hassane (vs. Mexico)
 Viktor Kryshanov (vs. Iran (group stage))

Source: BSRussia

Final standings

References

External links
Intercontinental Beach Soccer Cup Dubai 2019, at Beach Soccer Worldwide
Intercontinental Cup 2019, at Beach Soccer Russia (in Russian)

Beach Soccer Intercontinental Cup
Beach Soccer Intercontinental Cup
International association football competitions hosted by the United Arab Emirates
Intercontinental Cup
Beach Soccer Intercontinental Cup